Denis Sire (4 September 1953 – 16 January 2019) was a French cartoonist.

Biography
Sire entered the École nationale supérieure des arts appliqués et des métiers d'art at age 16, where he would meet Frank Margerin. After he graduated, Sire helped publish Métal hurlant, which was run by Jean-Pierre Dionnet and Philippe Manœuvre. His first individual work was Menace diabolique in 1979. He did works in the magazine L'Echo des Savanes such as Triste jeudi.

In 1978, Sire created five different covers for Presses de la Cité, and did the same for Cheval Noir in 1992. In 1993, he created another cover for Heavy Metal. He also drew vinyl record covers for the band Taxi Girl.

In 1997, he published a comic book with Jean-Pierre Dionnet, titled L'île des amazones. In 2002, he drew stamps for the French Collection Jeunesse. Sire drew the posters for the 2005 Circuit des Remparts. In 2006, Sire made 24 paintings representing the 24 hours of the Le Mans Classic race. That same year, Nickel Productions published a collection of his works, recounting his career.

Denis Sire died on 16 January 2019.

Works
Menace diabolique (1979) 
Bois Willys (1981) 
6T Mélodie (1982) 
Kosmik Komiks (1983)
Lisa Bay (1985) 
Best of racing (1987)
Ziblyne et Bettie (1992) 
Racing (1992) 
L'Île des amazones - Orchid Island (1997) 
Mon continental circus à moi (2000) 
Poupées de Sire (2001)
Courses de légende (2003) 
Denis Sire (2006) 
Poupées de Sire T. II (2011) 
Baron d'Holbach (2012) 
Baron d'Holbach 2 (2013)

References

1953 births
2019 deaths
French cartoonists